Papau is one of 22 islands in the Aitutaki atoll of the Cook Islands. It is located on the eastern perimeter of Aitutaki Lagoon, four kilometres to the east of the main island of Aitutaki. The island is 400m long and 200m wide.

References

Islands of Aitutaki